Carlos Eduardo Hernández (born December 12, 1975) is a former Major League Baseball infielder and right-handed batter who played for the Houston Astros (1999) and Seattle Mariners (2000). In 2005, he hit .321 and stole 39 bases for the Long Island Ducks of the independent Atlantic League. In 2006, he hit .280 with 32 stolen bases for Long Island.

Hernández was a .133 career hitter with one RBI and no home runs in 18 games.

See also
 List of Major League Baseball players from Venezuela

External links

1975 births
Living people
Binghamton Mets players
Colorado Springs Sky Sox players
Fresno Grizzlies players
Gulf Coast Astros players
Houston Astros players
Jackson Generals (Texas League) players
Long Island Ducks players
Major League Baseball infielders
Major League Baseball players from Venezuela
Navegantes del Magallanes players
New Orleans Zephyrs players
Norfolk Tides players
Quad City River Bandits players
Round Rock Express players
Seattle Mariners players
Baseball players from Caracas
Tacoma Rainiers players
Tiburones de La Guaira players
Venezuelan expatriate baseball players in the United States